The 2018–19 season is the 136th season in Bristol Rovers' history and their 91st in the English Football League. Rovers will compete in the third tier of English football, League One as well as three cup competitions, FA Cup, EFL Cup and EFL Trophy.

Transfers

Transfers in

Transfers out

Loans in

Loans out

Competitions

Pre-Season Friendlies
As of 12 June 2018, Bristol Rovers have announced four pre-season friendlies against Eerste Divisie side FC Eindhoven, Yeovil Town and Forest Green Rovers of EFL League Two, and newly promoted Southern League side Melksham Town.

League One

League table

Results summary

Results by matchday

Matches
On 21 June 2018, the League One fixtures for the forthcoming season were announced.

FA Cup

The first round draw was made live on BBC by Dennis Wise and Dion Dublin on 22 October.

EFL Cup

On 15 June 2018, the draw for the first round was made in Vietnam. The second round draw was made from the Stadium of Light on 16 August.

EFL Trophy
On 13 July 2018, the initial group stage draw bar the U21 invited clubs was announced. The draw for the second round was made live on Talksport by Leon Britton and Steve Claridge on 16 November. On 8 December, the third round draw was drawn by Alan McInally and Matt Le Tissier on Soccer Saturday. The Quarter-final draw was made conducted on Sky Sports by Don Goodman and Thomas Frank on 10 January 2019. The draw for the semi-finals took place on 25 January live on Talksport.

References

Bristol Rovers
Bristol Rovers F.C. seasons